John Wrottesley, 1st Baron Wrottesley (4 October 1771 – 16 March 1841), known as Sir John Wrottesley, 9th Baronet, from 1787 to 1838, was a British soldier and Member of Parliament.

Wrottesley was the son of Sir John Wrottesley, 8th Baronet. He served in the British Army and achieved the rank of major general. He was also appointed as Lieutenant-Colonel Commandant of the Western Regiment of Staffordshire Local Militia in 1809.

Wrottesley was also a Member of Parliament for Lichfield from 1799 to 1806, for Staffordshire from 1823 to 1832, and for Staffordshire South from 1832 to 1837. On 11 July 1838, he was ennobled as Baron Wrottesley, of Wrottesley in the County of Stafford.

Lord Wrottesley married firstly Lady Caroline Bennet, daughter of Charles Bennet, 4th Earl of Tankerville, in 1795. After his first wife's death in 1818, he married secondly Julia Conyers, daughter of John Conyers of Copped Hall, Essex, in 1819. Julia was the widow of Captain John Astley Bennet RN, the brother of Wrottesley's first wife. There were no children from this marriage. Lord Wrottesley died in March 1841, aged 69, and was succeeded in the baronetcy and barony by his son John Wrottesley.

References

External links 
 

1771 births
1841 deaths
Barons in the Peerage of the United Kingdom
British Army generals
Members of the Parliament of Great Britain for English constituencies
Members of the Parliament of the United Kingdom for English constituencies
UK MPs 1801–1802
UK MPs 1802–1806
UK MPs 1820–1826
UK MPs 1826–1830
UK MPs 1830–1831
UK MPs 1831–1832
UK MPs 1832–1835
UK MPs 1835–1837
UK MPs who were granted peerages
British MPs 1796–1800
32nd Regiment of Foot officers
29th Regiment of Foot officers
35th Regiment of Foot officers
Staffordshire Militia officers
Peers of the United Kingdom created by Queen Victoria